Sheepherder is an oil painting created by Chinese artist Chen Danqing in 1980 in Tibet. This painting is considered one of the Tibet Series. He captures a moment where a sheepherder takes to kiss a woman.

References

1980 paintings
Chinese paintings
Sheep in art